Eghosa Asemota Agbonifo is a Nigerian politician and serial entrepreneur from Benin City.

Education 
Eghosa was educated at Emotan Primary School, Benin City from 1991-1997. He later proceeded to Negbenebor International School for his secondary education between 1997- 2003. He received a bachelor’s degree in Computer Science from Benson Idahosa University between 2009-2014. He obtained a master’s degree in Luxury and Fashion Management from the prestigious Paris School of Business in Paris, France.

Business career 
Etek Luxury  was established as a luxury firm in 2008 in Benin, Edo State, Nigeria. Today, its operations have expanded to Lagos, and other cities. Etek as a brand has also expanded into real estate, automobile, and luxury. Etek Luxury dominates the luxurious market in Nigeria and is a major seller of top global brands like Gucci, Versace, Louis Vuitton, Prada, Chanel, Fendi, Dior, Nike, Burberry, Hermes, Armani, Dolce & Gabbana, Valentino, Balenciaga, Ralph Lauren, Saint Laurent, Givenchy, Zara, Calvin Klein and a host of others.

Etek as a global brand has diversified into real estate and has sold, rented, and leased out quality properties to clients.

Philanthropy 
With the Michael Agbonifo Foundation, he has impacted the lives of people in Oredo West Local Government and Edo State in general by providing food, shoes, empowerment to the people. He has been described as a great philanthropist whose philanthropic gesture has touched lives.

Political career 
In 2019, Eghosa contested for the Oredo West Constituency seat in the Edo State House of Assembly under the umbrella of People’s Democratic Party (PDP) as its flag bearer and emerged second in the main election. He is still active in politics.Edo state

Personal life 
Agbonifo lives in Benin, Edo State but most times shuttle Lagos. He is married to Mrs. Oshiolene Agbonifo and they are blessed with three children, two girls- Osamagbe and Osazemen while Eghosasere Michael is his son. He is also an avid enthusiast of Chelsea Football Club in London, United Kingdom.

Awards and Membership 
Agbonifo is a member of Lions Club International, Benin Club, and the National Association of Seadogs Pyrate Confraternity.

He was awarded as one of the top 20 fashionistas in Nigeria.

References

1985 births
Living people
People from Edo State
Philanthropy